The 1976 Manly-Warringah Sea Eagles season was the 30th in the club's history since their entry into the then New South Wales Rugby Football League premiership in 1947.

The 1976 Sea Eagles were coached by 1963–64 Kangaroo tourist Frank Stanton. Captaining the side was brilliant centre Bob Fulton. The club competed in the New South Wales Rugby Football League's 1976 Premiership season and played its home games at the 27,000 capacity Brookvale Oval.

Ladder

Regular season

Finals

Major Semi-Final

Preliminary final

Grand final

Player statistics
Note: Games and (sub) show total games played, e.g. 1 (1) is 2 games played.

Representative Players

State
 New South Wales – Graham Eadie, Terry Randall

City vs Country
 City Firsts – Graham Eadie, Max Krilich, Terry Randall

References

External links
Manly Warringah Sea Eagles official website
National Rugby League official website

Manly Warringah Sea Eagles seasons
Manly-Warringah Sea Eagles season
Manly-Warringah Sea Eagles season